ViRUS! is a Russian band, formed in 1999, and currently composed of Olga Lucky, Yuri Stupnik (DJ Doctor) and Andrey Gudas. ViRUS! produced techno-based pop music. The band was at the peak of its popularity in 1999–2001, and disappeared from the mainstream of Russian pop music after releasing several popular songs.

History 

Stupnik and Gudas attended the High School of Zelenograd (near Moscow) in 1998. Initially working as a duo, they were later joined by a female vocalist, fellow high school student Olga, who was then singing the House of Culture. The group were originally known as Akvarel ("Watercolor"), then Vot Tak ("That's How"). In 1998 their record was discovered by producers Igor Seliverstov and Leonid Velichkovskiy. They renamed themselves to Virus and released their first album, Do not try to find me.

The band's successful hits included "Schastye (Счастье)/Happiness/", "Poproshu tebya (Попрошу Тебя)/Ask you/", "Papa (Папа)/Father/", "Vsyo proydyot (Всё пройдёт)/Everything will pass/", and Ya lyublyu tebya, malysh (Я люблю тебя, малыш)/I love you baby/.

Virus toured in Germany, Russia, Israel, USA, Estonia, and other countries. Their song "alsou" was played on multiple radio stations. In 2005 they were involved in naming dispute involving LUCKY, DJ Doctor and DJ Chip, culminating in the rebranding of the band as ViRUS!.

Olga went on to have a solo career with her project Th3 CATS.

In 2019 they released a song called "In the Style Disco" the video of which depicts a nostalgic look at the 1990s.

Discography 
1999: Do Not Try to Find Me (Ты меня не ищи)
2000: Call Me (Позови меня)
2000: Give Me (Дай мне)
 2001: To The Sun Warmed (Чтобы солнце грело)
2002: Virus of Happiness (Вирус счастья)
2003: Little Brother (Братишка)
2005:  My Hero (Мой герой)
2007: ALL IN ONE (all discography in on CD)
2009: The Best DJ REMIX 2009 (remix by popular DJ's)
2009: Flight to stars (Polot k zvezdam)

1999 Do not try to find me 

1  Интро / Intro
2  Ты меня не ищи / Ty Menya Ne Ishchi
3  Все пройдет / Vse proydet
4  Без любви / Bez lyubvi
5  Игра / Igra
6  Помоги / Pomogi
7  Ручки / Ruchki
8  Мама / Mama
9  Нежное солнышко / Nezhnoe solnyshko
10  Письмо / Pis'mo
11 Я люблю / Ya lyublyu
12 Вирус А / Virus A

2000 Call Me 

1  Интро / Intro
2  Нарисуй / Narisuy
3  Не верь / Ne ver'
4  Почему? / Pochemu?
5  Мишени / Misheni
6  Бросай скорей / Brosay skorey
7  Позови меня / Pozovi menya
8  Отпускаю / Otpuskayu
9  Поппури (инструментальная версия) / Poppuri (instrumental'naya versiya)
10 Ножки II / Nozhki II
11 Вирус С / Virus C
12 Гимн LG / Gimn LG

2000 Day Mne 

1  Интро / Intro
2  Папа / Papa
3  Весна / Vesna
4  Дай мне / Day mne
5  Без любви / Bez lyubvi
6  Ручки (remix) / Ruchki (remix)
7  Ты меня не ищи (remix) / Ty menya ne ishchi (remix)
8  Ножки / Nozhki
9 Kап-кап / Kap-kap / Tear Drops
10 Я не могу / Ya ne mogu
11 Нежное солнышко / Nezhnoe solnyshko
12 Все пройдет (remix) / Vse proydet (remix)
13 Вирус В / Virus B

2001 To The Sun Warmed 
  Попрошу тебя
   Просто рядом иди
   Девчонка
   Не для тебя она
   Над облаками
   Бросай меня
   Интро
   Вирус D 
   Аутро
   Я танцую 
   Прости скорей 
   Непогода

2002 Virus of Happiness 

1  Интро / Intro
2  Счастье / Schast'e
3  Без тебя / Bez tebya
4  Я знаю / Ya znayu
5  Подари мне / Podari mne
6  Вирус е / Virus e
7  Детские слезы / Detskie slezy
8  Корабли / Korabli
9  Не попрошу / Ne poproshu
10 Попрошу (remix) / Poproshu (remix)
11 Счастье (remix) / Schast'e (remix)

2003 Bratishka (Little Brother) 

1  Братишка / Bratishka
2  Прогульщица / Progul'shchitsa
3  Лишь о тебе / Lish' o tebe
4  Города / Goroda
5  День рожденья / Den' rozhden'ya
6  Не нужен мне / Ne nuzhen mne
7  Фотография / Fotografiya
8  Непослушная / Neposlushnaya
9  Не понимаю / Ne ponimayu
10 Лучшая подруга / Luchshaya podruga
11 Не грусти / Ne grusti
12 Наоборот / Naoborot
13 Без тебя (ремикс) / Bez tebya (remiks)
14 Вирус F / Virus F

2005 Moi Geroi 

 Одинокая / Odinokaya
 Одна минута / Odna minuta
 Даже не думай / Dazhe ne dumay
 Лето / Leto
 Не могу без тебя / Ne mogu bez tebya
 Футбол / Futbol
 Подожди / Podozhdi
 Weekend
 Лето (HOT mix) / Leto (HOT mix)
 Мой герой / Moy geroy
 Ты меня не ищи '04 / Ty menya ne ishchi '04
 Иван (feat. Цветкоff) / Ivan (feat. Tsvetkoff)
 Не лечи / Ne lechi
 Тайна / Tayna

References

External links 
  Virus website
 Lyrics with English translations
 ViRUS! blog
 

Russian pop music groups
Musical groups from Moscow
Musical groups established in 1999
1999 establishments in Russia